The Théâtre des Variétés is a theatre and "salle de spectacles" at 7–8, boulevard Montmartre, 2nd arrondissement, in Paris. It was declared a monument historique in 1974.

History
It owes its creation to the theatre director Mademoiselle Montansier (Marguerite Brunet). Imprisoned for debt in 1803 and frowned upon by the government, a decree of 1806 ordered her company to leave the Théâtre du Palais-Royal which then bore the name of "Variétés". The decree's aim was to move out Montansier's troupe to make room for the company from the neighbouring Théâtre-Français, which had stayed empty even as the Variétés-Montansier had enjoyed immense public favour. Strongly unhappy about having to leave the theatre by 1 January 1807, the 77-year-old Montansier gained an audience with Napoleon himself and received his help and protection. She thus reunited the "Société des Cinq", which directed her troupe, in order to found a new theatre, the one which stands at the side of the passage des Panoramas. It was inaugurated on 24 June 1807. The theatre plays a prominent role in Émile Zola's 1880 novel, Nana, as it is the theatre in which the title character achieves celebrity in the opening chapters.

Other activities
In 2012 the theatre began to host technical conferences such as dotJS or dotScale.

Premieres at the theatre

 1833: La Modiste et le Lord, 2-act opera by Auguste Pilati
 1856: L'Amour et Psyché, 1 act opera by Auguste Pilati
 1864: La belle Hélène, opéra bouffe by Jacques Offenbach, libretto by Meilhac and Halévy
 1867: La Grande-Duchesse de Gérolstein, opéra bouffe by Jacques Offenbach, libretto by Meilhac and Halévy
 1868: La Périchole, opéra bouffe by Jacques Offenbach, libretto by Meilhac and Halévy
 1869: Les brigands, opéra bouffe by Jacques Offenbach, libretto by Meilhac and Halévy
 1883: Mam'zelle Nitouche, vaudeville-operette by Hervé
 1907: L'Enfant prodigue, the first feature-length European film, directed by Michel Carré, fils
 1923: Ciboulette, operetta by Reynaldo Hahn, libretto by Robert de Flers and Francis de Croisset
 1946: César by Marcel Pagnol, after his film of the same name

Directors

1807–19 : Mlle Montansier
1820–30 : Mira Brunet
1930–36 : Armand Dartois
1836 : Jean-François Bayard
1837–39 : Philippe Pinel-Dumanoir
1839 : Jouslin de la Salle
1840 : M. Leroy
1840–47 : Nestor Roqueplan
1847–49 : M. Morin
1849–51 : M. Thibeaudeau-Milon (M. Bowes, proprietor)
1851–54 : M. Carpier (M. Bowes, proprietor)
1855 : MM. Laurencin & Zacheroni (M. Bowes, proprietor)
1855 : Hippolyte & Théodore Cogniard
1856–69 : Hippolyte Cogniard & Jules Noriac
1869–91 : Eugène Bertrand
1892–1914 : Fernand Samuel
1914–40 : Max Maurey
1940–43 : Émile Petit
1944–45 : Max Maurey & Émile Petit
1946–47 : Max & Denis Maurey
1947–75 : Denis & Marcel Maurey
1975–89 : Jean-Michel Rouzière
1989–91 : Francis Lemonnier
1991–2004 : Jean-Paul Belmondo
since 2005 : Jean-Manuel Bajen

See also
Suzanne Lagier

References

External links

 Official website

Varietes
Buildings and structures in the 2nd arrondissement of Paris